Elva kvinnor i ett hus (English: Eleven Women in One House) is the fifth studio album by Swedish pop singer Agnetha Fältskog, released on 1 December 1975 by Cupol Records.

Album information

The album was recorded in the same period as her bandmate Anni-Frid Lyngstad made her Swedish number one album Frida ensam - and both were recorded between sessions and a very busy promotion schedule for the ABBA albums Waterloo and ABBA. Elva Kvinnor I Ett Hus was originally slated for release in 1973 but following Agnetha's pregnancy that year and later the unexpected success with ABBA it was postponed and not released until late 1975. By then, four years had passed since the release of her last Swedish solo-album, När en vacker tanke blir en sång.

Fältskog composed all but one of the songs herself with lyrics by Swedish writer, journalist and lyricist Bosse Carlgren. The only exception was the Swedish version of the ABBA song "S.O.S." which was written by Benny Andersson, Stig Anderson and Fältskog's husband at the time, Björn Ulvaeus. Fältskog's record company Cupol insisted on including a Swedish version of an ABBA song to increase album sales.
After two recordings in 1973, "Elva kvinnor i ett hus" marks the first time that Agnetha produced an entire album herself.

"Elva Kvinnor I Ett Hus" was first released on CD in 2004 as part of the "Agnetha Fältskog De Första Åren" 6 CD boxed set. It also appeared on the Agnetha Faltskog edition of Original Album Classics, part of a larger series of identically named box sets issued by Sony Music in 2008.

Recording process

The original album design was very different from the eventual release. Fältskog and Carlgren originally planned to call the album "Tolv kvinnor i ett hus" (Twelve Women In A House) with each song on the album describing twelve different characters, all women leading very different lives, but all living in the same house. The package would have included a gatefold sleeve with artwork by Carlgren picturing the twelve fictitious women as well as several photos of Fältskog herself, but due to the success of ABBA the singer had less time to write and record her own songs. At one point it seemed uncertain that the album would ever be finished which led to the record company cutting the production budget, which in turn meant that it was impossible to release it with the lavish gatefold sleeve and accompanying artwork. In the end there were only ten songs written by Fältskog, coupled with the opening track "S.O.S.", a song that neither fit nor was included in the original concept.

The melodies on "Elva Kvinnor I Ett Hus" are generally seen as more complex and more influenced by contemporary pop and rock than on Fältskog's earlier albums, which had been in the fairly lightweight schlager genre, and Bosse Carlgren's poignant, ironic and humorous lyrics make up small stories in themselves - some even including slightly risqué content. "Och han väntar på mig" describes an adult woman being courted by an eager teenage boy, and the track "Doktorn!", famously includes the line "I've tried candy instead, but I get as fat as a pig." The final track on the album, "Visa i åttonde månaden" (Song In The Eighth Month) was however written from a very personal perspective; it was composed during Fältskog's pregnancy with daughter Linda, early in 1973.

Fältskog's vocal performances on "Elva Kvinnor I Ett Hus" are considered technically superior when compared to her earlier solo output, most likely as a result of the vocal coaching she had started when ABBA began to make a name for themselves. Music critics have also noted that the production values on the album are noticeably higher than on previous efforts, some calling it her 'masterpiece'.

Promotion and chart success

Agnetha promoted the album with a live performance of "Dom har glömt" and "Tack för en underbar, vanlig dag" on the Swedish Sommarnöjet TV show. Even if ABBA already were a number one act in Sweden at this time, and although the album was a considerable critical and commercial success, it failed to reach the Top 10 on the Swedish album charts, peaking at no 11, even with the inclusion of her Swedish version of "SOS". Elva Kvinnor I Ett Hus however spent a respectable 53 weeks on the charts, and three of the eleven tracks entered the important radio chart Svensktoppen, with "S.O.S." becoming another number one for Fältskog. The Swedish language "SOS" single also reached #4 on the singles chart in January 1976.

English-language versions

As mentioned above "SOS" was originally recorded in English by ABBA. So was "Mina ögon", included on the first Björn & Benny, Agnetha & Frida album Ring Ring in 1973, then called "Disillusion" with lyrics by Björn Ulvaeus, in effect making it the only ABBA recording to be composed by Fältskog. It also makes it one of just two ABBA tracks during their whole career not to be composed by the Andersson/Anderson/Ulvaeus team, the other being a medley of American folk songs, issued as the B-side of 1978 single "Summer Night City".

Track listing

Singles

"Elva kvinnor i ett hus" includes one of Agnetha's most successful Swedish solo hits, namely her Swedish version of ABBA's "S.O.S.". Upon its release at the end of 1975, it entered the Swedish singles chart and eventually peaked at number 4 in January 1976, becoming only her third single to reach that chart and her first one since 1968.

Svensktoppen

Besides being a top 5 hit on the official Swedish singles chart, Agnetha's version of "S.O.S." also quickly became a huge hit on the important Swedish radio chart Svensktoppen. During its 11-week chart-run, it also topped the hitlist, making it Agnetha's third Svensktoppen number 1.
In early 1976 two other tracks from "Elva kvinnor i ett hus" managed to enter Svensktoppen, without being released on single: "Doktorn!" and "Tack för en underbar, vanlig dag" both reached number five and also managed to bring the album back into the charts, which itself reached its highest position in May 1976 (number 11).

Weekly charts

Certifications

Personnel
 Agnetha Fältskog – vocals, producer
 Michael B. Tretow – engineer
 Sven-Olof Walldoff – orchestra
 Wlodek Gulgowski, Janne Schaffer, Sven-Olof Walldoff – arrangement
 Lars-Johan Roundqvist – idea and production

The following musicians contributed to the recording of "Elva kvinnor i ett hus":
 Piano – Benny Andersson, Jan Boquist, Wlodek Gulgowski, Björn J:son Lindh
 drums – Ola Brunkert, Malando Gassama, Roger Palm, Douglas Westlund
 guitars – Björn Linder, Janne Schaffer, Lasse Westman
 bass – Rutger Gunnarsson, Mike Watson
 bass clarinet – Rune Falk
 oboe – Ronnie Bogren
 background vocals – Anders Glenmark, Lasse Holm, Anni-Frid Lyngstad, Claes Palmkvist, Beverly Sundel, Björn Ulvaeus, Lasse Westman, Inger Öst
 strings – Anders Dahl, Gunnar Klinge, Zdrzalka Krzysztof, Gunnar Mickols, Claes Nillson, Bertil Orsin, Per Sandklef, Sixten Strömvall
 viola – Lars Arvinder, Lars Brolin, Niels Heie
 cello – Erik Dybeck, Olle Gustafsson

References

http://www.carlgrens.info/htmlfiles/lyricsfiles/jefffey4th.htm
 Liner notes, Agnetha Fältskog: Agnetha Fältskog De Första Åren (2004 box set). Sony Music Entertainment.
 Wille Wendt: Topplistan - The Official Swedish Single & Album Charts, Premium Förlag 1993, 

Agnetha Fältskog albums
1975 albums